Kalma is the Finnish goddess of death and decay, her name meaning "The Stench of Corpses". Her favorite places to linger are graveyards and cemeteries; in fact, one Finnish word for graveyard is kalmisto, derived from her name. Some sources state that she moves on a vehicle of odors, much like a puff of smoke.

Her father is Tuoni and her mother Tuonetar. Kalma may also have several sisters, Kipu-Tyttö, Kivutar, Loviatar, and Vammatar, all of whom live in the Finnish underworld realm of Tuonela. Kalma is accompanied and protected by Surma, a dog-like creature whose name literally means "death" (though the word surma is usually used to refer to someone being killed, as opposed to dying of natural causes).

Their stories are recited in the Finnish national epic Kalevala.

References

Finnish goddesses
Death goddesses
Underworld goddesses